Daysville is an unincorporated community in Ogle County, Illinois, United States. It is located along the Rock River, southeast of Oregon.

History 
A post office was in operation at Daysville from 1839 to 1900. The community bears the name of Colonel Jehiel Day, a local pioneer.

References

External links 
NACo

Unincorporated communities in Ogle County, Illinois
Unincorporated communities in Illinois
Populated places established in the 1830s
1830s establishments in Illinois